Padang Besar  (often abbreviated as Padang or P.B.) is a border town located in the northern part of the state of Perlis in Malaysia as well northmost town in Malaysia. It is situated on the border with Songkhla province, Thailand, 35 kilometers northeast of Kangar and about 57 km southwest of Hat Yai. The town opposite Padang Besar in Thailand is also known as Padang Besar, although the locals here usually refer to the town as "Pekan Siam" or Siamese town.
The town is a "shopping heaven" and popular destination for Malaysians because of the duty-free shopping complex in between the border checkpoints of the two countries. The town attracts several thousand visitors from Peninsular Malaysia and southern Thailand every weekend and during public holidays.

Border Crossing
Padang Besar is connected to Federal Route 7 and railway which lead to the border crossing into Thailand. The road and railway respectively connect directly to Padang Besar – Sadao Highway (Thailand Route 4054) and State Railway of Thailand to form part of the Trans-Asian Railway.

The Malaysian checkpoint is located to the north east of town, about 300m from the actual border where the Thai checkpoint is located. Both the Malaysian and Thai checkpoints have drive-through lanes.

The Padang Besar railway station has Malaysia's only co-located or juxtaposed customs, immigration and quarantine facility for both Malaysia and Thailand and rail passengers are processed for exiting Malaysia and entering Thailand (or vice versa if traveling the other direction) in the station. The Padang Besar station in Thailand only serves as a domestic station.

Border Barrier

In the 1970s, both Malaysia and Thailand constructed walls along their common border, mostly in Perlis/Satun and Perlis/Songkhla as well as Kedah/Songkhla portions of the border to curb smuggling. The walls were of concrete and steel and were topped with barbed wire as well as iron fencing at other stretches. As both countries constructed their own walls a little into their own territory, a strip of "no-man's-land" about 10m wide was created and this strip of land became a convenient refuge for smugglers (not all smuggling was deterred by the wall) and drug runners.

In 2001, the two countries agreed to construct just one wall along the border which would be located just inside Thai territory. The new border wall is 2.5m high and made up of a concrete lower half and steel fencing on the upper half. At the base, barbed wire runs along the length of the wall.

While the stated reason for the construction of the wall has been to curb smuggling and encroachment, security reasons - earlier in the 1970s and 1980s resulting from Malaysian communist groups and groups involved in the South Thailand insurgency in the late 1990s and early 2000s - have also been a major push for the barrier to be constructed.

History

The history of Padang Besar is shown below:
In 1913, rail connection linking Padang Besar in Perlis to Singapore was built.
In 1918, rail connection linking Padang Besar in Thailand to Hatyai in Songkla was built, therefore, Malaysia 3rd custom and immigration branch office was established in railway station to serve the train direct crossing into Thailand.
In 1928, first Chinese primary school was built under the huge desire from local Chinese citizen.
In December 1941, Padang Besar was a British Malaya temporary army base for support war against Japanese army in Khlong Ngea Songkla Thailand to delay Japanese forces from reaching Malaya during World War II. (See Operation Krohcol)
In the 1960s, Golden Triangle Commercial Area was built just beside the current new Padang Besar Railways Station which just 1m away from the border line in between Malaysia and Thailand. It became a famous shopping heaven in Malaysia and Southern Thailand. Besides, smuggling of this area is serious and finally caught the attention from both Malaysia and Thailand governments.
In 1970, second primary school Sekolah Kebangsaan Padang Besar (U) was built.
In the 1990s, new Padang Besar Immigration and Custom Complex were constructed to replace the Sadao Rd custom check point.  Meanwhile, the old railway station renovated and upgraded to inland dryport. Both checkpoints were link together by pedestrian bridge to form Malaysia first ICQ complex.
In 1994, Golden Triangle Commercial Area was demolished by Perlis state government due to the smuggling activity of this area is serious, affected Thailand border economic and relationship between both countries. Meanwhile, new commercial area (Aked Niaga Padang Besar) was built to replace the demolished commercial area.
In 2000, first secondary school Sekolah Menengah Kebangsaan Padang Besar Utara was built.
In Oct 2014 Ipoh-Padang Besar double-tracking and electrification rail project completed, overall construction duration took 6 years.

Economy
Tourism, international trading and the logistics sector are the most important profit source to local citizens if compared to agriculture. Padang Besar's industry area is one of the most important industry areas in Perlis.

Tourism
Padang Besar is a popular shopping paradise since 1960, this town is frequently visited by citizens from both Malaysia and Thailand for travel and business purpose. Nowadays, this town still attracts several thousands of visitors from Peninsular Malaysia and Southern Thailand every weekend and during public holidays. Majority of Malaysians frequent Kompleks Aked Niaga Padang Besar, Pasar Padang Besar and Gapura Square. Jalan Besar (town center) is also one of the famous shopping area for Thai and Malaysian visitor.

Except for the above-mentioned shopping destinations, places of interest that can be reached within 20mins from Padang Besar are listed as below
Gua Kelam (Limestone cave)
Chuping (Malaysia largest sugar cane land and one the Malaysia Rally Championship circuit)
Perlis State Park (the only semi deciduous forest in Malaysia)
Timah Tasoh Lake

Demographics
Based on the research from Malaysian general election 2008, Population in Padang Besar town is around 10000, the population structure based on races are as below:
Malay: 73.52% 
Chinese: 23.23% 
Indian: 2.82% 
Other: 0.59% (majority is Thailand Muslim from Southern Thailand)

Languages
Malay language—the national language, is the principal language of Perlis as well as Padang Besar but the native variant is Perlis Malay. Other major languages spoken by local citizen are Hokkien, Mandarin Chinese, Thai and Tamil. Majority of local citizens are able to speak basic English.

References

External links

Tourism Malaysia - Padang Besar
 

Padang Besar
Malaysia–Thailand border crossings
Towns in Perlis